Dehram is a city and capital of Dehram District, in Farashband County, Fars Province, Iran.  At the 2006 census, its population was 2,946, in 684 families.

References

Populated places in Farashband County

Cities in Fars Province